Count Engelbert I of Berg (d. July 1189 in Serbia) ruled the County of Berg from 1160 to 1189. He was the son of Adolf IV of Berg.

Through his loyalty to the German Emperor and the Archbishops of Cologne he succeeded in stabilising the county and increasing its revenues. He took Bensberg Palace, Neu-Windeck and Elberfeld.

In July 1189 he was killed near Kovin, in Serbia, while on his way to the Holy Land with the crusade of emperor Frederick Barbarossa.

He married Margaret of Geldern (born 1157, died 1190?) and his sons were:
 Count Adolf VI of Berg (d. 1218) and
 Count Engelbert II of Berg (d. 7 November 1225), otherwise known as Engelbert I, Archbishop of Cologne and as Saint Engelbert.

Literature
Alberic of Troisfontaines (MGH, Scriptores XXIII).
Annales Rodenses (MGH, Scriptores, XVI).
Annalista Saxo (MGH, Scriptores VI).
Gesta Trevirorum (MGH, Scriptores VIII).
MGH, Diplomata.
REK I-II. – Rheinisches UB.
Hömberg, "Geschichte".
Jackman, "Counts of Cologne".
Kluger, "Propter claritatem generis". – Kraus, Entstehung.
Lück, D. "Der Avelgau, die erste fassbare Gebietseinteilung an der unteren Sieg". In: Heimatbuch der Stadt Siegburg I. Ed. H. J. Roggendorf. Siegburg, 1964. Pp. 223–85.
Lück, D. "In pago Tuizichgowe – Anmerkungen zum Deutzgau". Rechtsrheinisches Köln 3 (1977) 1–9.
Milz, "Vögte".

This article is based on a translation of the one in the German Wikipedia - see link

1189 deaths
Counts of Berg

House of Limburg-Stirum
Christians of the Third Crusade
Year of birth unknown